Captive of the Desert is a 1990 French drama film directed by Raymond Depardon. It was entered into the 1990 Cannes Film Festival. It was based in part on the experiences of Françoise Claustre who was captured by Chadian rebels in 1974, later joined by her husband, and the pair finally released in 1977.

Cast
 Sandrine Bonnaire - La captive
 Dobi Koré
 Fadi Taha
 Dobi Wachinké
 Badei Barka
 Atchi Wahi-Li
 Daki Koré
 Isai Koré
 Mohamed Ixa
 Brahim Barkaï
 Hadji Azouma
 Barkama Hadji
 Sidi Hadji Maman

References

External links

1990 films
1990s French-language films
1990 drama films
Films set in 1974
Cold War films
Films set in Chad
Films directed by Raymond Depardon
French drama films
1990s French films